Àlex Corretja and Fabrice Santoro were the defending champions but only Corretja competed that year with Jose Antonio Conde.

Conde and Corretja lost in the quarterfinals to Cristian Brandi and Emilio Sánchez.

Andrew Kratzmann and Marcos Ondruska won in the final 7–6, 6–4 against Brandi and Sánchez.

Seeds
Champion seeds are indicated in bold text while text in italics indicates the round in which those seeds were eliminated.

 Luis Lobo /  Javier Sánchez (quarterfinals)
 Donald Johnson /  Francisco Montana (quarterfinals)
 Hendrik Jan Davids /  Stephen Noteboom (first round)
 Cristian Brandi /  Emilio Sánchez (final)

Draw

References
 1996 Campionati Internazionali di Sicilia Doubles Draw

Campionati Internazionali di Sicilia
1996 ATP Tour
Camp